The Polizia Stradale is the national highway patrol of Italy and is a sub-directorate of the Italian State Police.

The Polizia Stradale patrols the 7,000 kilometers of motorways (autostrada) in Italy and the main highways and arterial roads outside towns.  Missions include the prevention and detection of driving offences, traffic accident reporting, planning and carrying out services to regulate traffic, providing escorts for road safety, protecting and controlling the road network, rescue operations and cooperation in the collection of traffic flow data.

Between the several activities it carries out also services of supply and regulation of the traffic. Under the profile of the communication verification the news on the practicability that then comes diffuse from the Center coordination information on street emergency (Centro Addestramento Polizia di Stato) (C.C.I.S.S.). It also promotes the initiatives and campaigns of sensibilities of the citizens, in particular young people, on street emergencies.

History
During the reconstruction after World War II the number of automobiles on the roads began to increase. In order to respond to the increasing requirements of this traffic, highway patrol sections were formed at 72 police headquarters with the employment of 2600 men and numerous motorcycles of various origins, mostly military surplus, in the first months of 1946.

The PS was established by a decree issued 26 November 1947 signed by the former Temporary Head of the State, Enrico de Nicola. He established the tasks of the service and its organization, attributing some the management not to the Ministry of the Public Works but to the Interior.

Subsequently the Polizia Stradale was organized into departments with regional responsibility and sections with local competence with subordinate sub-sections and detachments. The necessity of centralized control has increased with the passing of the years.
http://quanteruote.libero.it/media/blogs/qr/renaultlagunapolizia.JPG

Organization 
The PS is managed by the Central Directorate for Police, Railway, and Communications and the Special Police Departments of State Police, a part of Department of Public Security at the Ministry of Interior.

The Traffic Police is divided into: 
 Compartments: in all the regional capitals except for:
 Aosta, which is part of the compartment Piedmont, while Molise refers to the compartment Campania.
 In Sicily were established in eastern Sicily compartments Catania and western Sicily to Palermo.
 The compartment Veneto for geographical reasons is based in Padua.
 Sections: in all provincial capitals.
 Detachments: 187 in all, are located near major towns.
 Highway Operating Centers (COA ): 14 in all activities and coordination of patrols ensure that the motorways.
 Sections: 81 in all, built in agreement with the company or highways with the Azienda Nazionale Autonoma delle Strade (ANAS).
 12,000 persons

Equipment

The PS uses high powered cars and motorcycles with some vans, ambulances and other specialised vehicles as needed.

Cars
BMW 3 Series (E90)
Volkswagen Passat 
Alfa Romeo 159
Alfa Romeo Giulia Veloce
Alfa Romeo Giulietta	
Audi A4	 
BMW 330 Touring 
Jeep Renegade 
Volvo V50
Subaru Legacy and Impreza
Renault Laguna Grandtour
Renault Laguna
Lamborghini Gallardo and Lamborghini LP560-4  ( both out of service )
Lamborghini Huracán
SEAT Alhambra

Motorcycles
 Aprilia Nuovo Pegaso
 BMW RT 850
 Moto Guzzi Falcone

Others
Fiat Ducato 2

Sidearm
 Beretta 92 - 9mm (seen in officers holsters)

See also
Italian Police

References

External links

 Polizia Stradale Official site
 Official website
 Official website {dead link}

Polizia di Stato
Road transport in Italy